was a Japanese football player and manager. He played for Japan national team. He also managed Japan national team. He was the president of the Japan Football Association from 1994 to 1998.

Club career
Naganuma was born in Hiroshima on September 5, 1930. After graduating from Kwansei Gakuin University and Chuo University, he joined Furukawa Electric in 1955. Furukawa Electric won 1960, 1961 and 1964 Emperor's Cup. In 1961, he was selected first Japanese Footballer of the Year awards. In 1965, Furukawa Electric joined new league Japan Soccer League. He played 19 games and scored 8 goals in the league. He retired in 1967.

National team career
In March 1954, Naganuma was selected Japan national team for 1954 World Cup qualification. At this qualification, on March 7, he debuted and scored a goal against South Korea. He also played at 1954 Asian Games. In 1956, He was selected Japan for 1956 Summer Olympics. However, he could not play for physical condition. He played 4 games and scored 1 goal for Japan until 1961.

Coaching career
In 1959, when Naganuma was player, he became a manager for Furukawa Electric. In 1960, he led the club won to 1960 Emperor's Cup champions. This was the first Emperor's Cup champions as a works team. In 1962, when he was 32 years old, he named a manager for Japan national team as Hidetoki Takahashi successor. He managed Japan with assistant coach Shunichiro Okano at 1964 Summer Olympics in Tokyo and 1968 Summer Olympics in Mexico City. At 1968 Summer Olympics, Japan won Bronze Medal. This is the first time an Asian team won a medal at Olympics. In 2018, this team was selected Japan Football Hall of Fame. He also managed at 1966 Asian Games. In 1969, he resigned after 1970 World Cup qualification and Okano was promoted to new manager.

At 1972 Summer Olympics qualification, following Japan's failure to qualify for 1972 Summer Olympics, Okano resigned and Naganuma became a manager again in 1972. He managed 1974 World Cup qualification and 1974 Asian Games. At 1976 Summer Olympics qualification in April 1976, following Japan's failure to qualify for 1976 Summer Olympics, Naganuma resigned.

Naganuma became a vice-president of Japan Football Association (JFA) in 1987 and a president of JFA in 1994. He also served as vice-president World Cup bidding committee and Japan World Cup Organizing Committee for 2002 World Cup. In 1998, he resigned a president of JFA. In 2005, he was selected Japan Football Hall of Fame.

On June 2, 2008, Naganuma died of pneumonia at the age of 77.

Club statistics

National team statistics

National team goals

References

External links
 
 Japan National Football Team Database
Japan Football Hall of Fame at Japan Football Association
Japan Football Hall of Fame (Japan team at 1968 Olympics) at Japan Football Association

1930 births
2008 deaths
Kwansei Gakuin University alumni
Chuo University alumni
Association football people from Hiroshima Prefecture
Japanese footballers
Japanese football managers
Japanese football executives
Japan international footballers
Japan Soccer League players
JEF United Chiba players
Japan national football team managers
Player-coaches
Footballers at the 1954 Asian Games
Olympic footballers of Japan
Footballers at the 1956 Summer Olympics
Japanese referees and umpires
Recipients of the Order of the Rising Sun
Hibakusha
Association football forwards
Asian Games competitors for Japan
Presidents of the Japan Futsal Federation